Tetrorea is a genus of longhorn beetles of the subfamily Lamiinae, containing the following species:

 Tetrorea cilipes White, 1846
 Tetrorea discedens Sharp, 1880
 Tetrorea longipennis Sharp, 1886
 Tetrorea sellata Sharp, 1882

References

Desmiphorini